The Milne model was a special-relativistic cosmological model proposed by Edward Arthur Milne in 1935. It is mathematically equivalent to a special case of the FLRW model in the limit of zero energy density and it obeys the cosmological principle. The Milne model is also similar to Rindler space, a simple re-parameterization of flat Minkowski space.

Since it features both zero energy density and maximally negative spatial curvature, the Milne model is inconsistent with cosmological observations. Cosmologists actually observe the universe's density parameter to be consistent with unity and its curvature to be consistent with flatness.

Milne metric
The Milne universe is a special case of a more general Friedmann–Lemaître–Robertson–Walker model (FLRW). The Milne solution can be obtained from the more generic FLRW model by demanding that the energy density, pressure and cosmological constant all equal zero and the spatial curvature is negative. From these assumptions and the Friedmann equations it follows that the scale factor must depend on time coordinate linearly.

Setting the spatial curvature and speed of light to unity the metric for a Milne universe can be expressed with hyperspherical coordinates as:

where

is the metric for a two-sphere and

The empty space that the Milne model describes can be identified with the inside of a light cone of an event in Minkowski space by a change of coordinates.

Milne developed this model independent of general relativity but with awareness of special relativity. As he initially described it, the model has no expansion of space, so all of the redshift (except that caused by peculiar velocities) is explained by a recessional velocity associated with the hypothetical "explosion". However, the mathematical equivalence of the zero energy density version of the FLRW metric to Milne's model implies that a full general relativistic treatment using Milne's assumptions would result in an increasing scale factor and associated metric expansion of space with the unique feature of a linearly increasing scale factor for all time since the deceleration parameter is uniquely zero for such a model.

Incompatibility with observation
Even though the Milne model as a special case of a Friedmann-Robertson-Walker universe is a solution to General relativity, the assumption of zero energy content limits its use as a realistic description of the universe. Besides lacking the capability of describing matter Milne's universe is also incompatible with certain cosmological observations. In particular it makes no prediction of the cosmic microwave background radiation nor the abundance of light elements which are hallmark pieces of evidence that cosmologists agree support Big Bang cosmology over alternatives.

Milne's density function

Milne proposed that the universe's density changes in time because of an initial outward explosion of matter. Milne's model assumes an inhomogeneous density function which is Lorentz Invariant (around the event t=x=y=z=0). When rendered graphically Milne's density distribution shows a three-dimensional spherical Lobachevskian pattern with outer edges moving outward at the speed of light. Every inertial body perceives itself to be at the center of the explosion of matter (see observable universe), and sees the local universe as homogeneous and isotropic in the sense of the cosmological principle.

Unless the universe modeled has zero density, Milne's proposal does not follow the predictions of general relativity for the curvature of space caused by global matter distribution, as seen in, for example statistics associated with large-scale structure.

Differences between Milne model and other models
In order to explain the existence of matter in the universe, Milne proposed a physical explosion of matter which would not affect the universe's geometry. This is in contrast to the metric expansion of space that is the hallmark feature of many of the more famous cosmological models including the Big Bang and Steady State models. Milne's universe shares a superficial similarity to Einstein's static universe in that the metric of space is not time-dependent. Unlike Einstein's initial cosmology, Milne's proposal directly contradicts the Einstein equations for cosmological scales. Special relativity becomes a global property of Milne's universe while general relativity is confined to a local property. The reverse is true for standard cosmological models, and most scientists and mathematicians agree that the latter is self-consistent while the former is mathematically impossible.

Edward Arthur Milne predicted a kind of event horizon through the use of this model: "The particles near the boundary tend towards invisibility as seen by the central observer, and fade into a continuous background of finite intensity." The horizon arises naturally from length contraction seen in special relativity which is a consequence of the speed of light upper bound for physical objects. In Milne's universe, the velocities of objects approach this upper bound while the distance to these objects approaches the speed of light multiplied by the time since the event of the initial explosion of material. Beyond this distance, objects do not lie in the observable part of the Milne universe.

At the time Milne proposed his model, observations of the universe did not appear to be in a homogeneous form. This, to Milne, was a deficiency inherent in the competing cosmological models which relied on the cosmological principle that demanded a homogeneous universe. “This conventional homogeneity is only definite when the motion of the particles is first prescribed.” With present observations of the homogeneity of the universe on the largest scales seen in the cosmic microwave background and in the so-called "End of Greatness", questions about the homogeneity of the universe have been settled in the minds of most observational cosmologists.

Notes

References
Milne Cosmology: Why I Keep Talking About It  - a detailed non-technical introduction to the Milne model
 Wegener, Mogens True. Non-Standard Relativity: A Philosopher's Handbook of Heresies in Physics. BoD–Books on Demand, 2016. A thorough historical and theoretical study of the British Tradition in Cosmology, and one long celebration of Milne.

Obsolete theories in physics
Exact solutions in general relativity
Minkowski spacetime
1935 in science